The Weavers is a play in five acts written by the German playwright Gerhart Hauptmann in 1892. The play, probably Hauptmann's most important drama, sympathetically portrays a group of Silesian weavers who staged an uprising in 1844 due to their concerns about the Industrial Revolution.

The play was translated into Yiddish by Pinchas Goldhar in the 1920s, after which it became a favorite of the Yiddish stage. In 1927 it was adapted into a German silent film The Weavers directed by Frederic Zelnik and starring Paul Wegener. A Broadway version of The Weavers was staged in 1915–1916.

Plot summary

Most of the characters are proletarians struggling for their rights. Unlike most plays of any period, as pointed out many times in literary criticism and introductions, the play has no true central character, providing ample opportunities for ensemble acting.

Criticism
Critic Barrett H. Clark's commented in 1914: "As one of Gerhart Hauptmann's experiments in dramatic form, The Weavers is highly significant. Instead of a hero, he has created a mob; this mob is, therefore, the protagonist—or chief character—and if individuals emerge from the rank and file they are not thrust into the foreground to stay long. It is the weavers as a class that is ever before us, and the unity of the play is in them and in them alone; they are only parts of a larger picture which will take shape as the story advances, and are not intended to be taken as important individuals."

Cultural impact 

The Weavers served as the inspiration for Käthe Kollwitz's print series of the same name (1893-1897). Kollwitz claimed to have attended the premiere in Berlin. Several of these prints were included in Upton Sinclair's history of protest literature, The Cry for Justice (1915). It remains one of her most well-known cycles of work. It was republished as a portfolio in 1931.

References

External links

The text of the play at the Archive.org

1892 plays
Plays by Gerhart Hauptmann
Plays set in Germany
German plays adapted into films